The Madagascar lowland forests or Madagascar humid forests are a tropical moist broadleaf forest ecoregion found on the eastern coast of the island of Madagascar, home to a plant and animal mix that is 80 to 90% endemic, with the forests of the eastern plain being a particularly important location of this endemism. They are included in the Global 200 list of outstanding ecoregions.

Geography
The ecoregion constitutes a narrow strip of lowland forests between Madagascar's east coast and the mountainous central highlands, from sea level to  elevation. The ecoregion is under the direct influence of the oceanic trade winds, which maintain a warm, humid climate; rainfall is above 2,000 mm per year and can reach up to 6,000 mm on the Masoala peninsula.

The lowland forests extend from Marojejy in the north to the southeast corner of the island. At the northern edge of ecoregion around Vohemar, the moist forests transition to the drier Madagascar dry deciduous forests ecoregion. To the east, at approximately  elevation, the lowland forests transition gradually to the Madagascar subhumid forests ecoregion. The southern end of the ecoregion lies at the crest of the Anosyennes Mountains, where a narrow belt of dry transitional forest marks the transition to the dry spiny forests ecoregion in the mountains' rain shadow.

Flora
The lowland forests are characterized by dense evergreen forests, 82% of which is endemic species, with a canopy exceeding . Typical canopy species include Dalbergia, Diospyros, Ocotea, Symphonia, and Tambourissa; emergents of Canarium, Albizia, and Brochoneura acuminata rise above the canopy. The lowland forests have a rich diversity of Pandanus, palm, bamboo, and epiphytic orchid species. At higher elevations the trees become shorter and have a denser undergrowth.

Fauna
The lowland forests represent a great reservoir of diversity and endemism. Nearly all of Madagascar's endemic mammal genera are represented there, including all five families of lemurs.

Fifteen species and subspecies of lemurs are endemic and near-endemic to the ecoregion, including the aye-aye (Daubentonia madagascariensis), the hairy-eared dwarf lemur (Allocebus trichotis), both species of ruffed lemurs (Varecia variegata, V. rubra), the indri (Indri indri), the eastern woolly lemur (Avahi laniger), the diademed sifaka (Propithecus diadema), Milne-Edwards's sifaka (P. edwardsi), the golden bamboo lemur (Hapalemur aureus), the greater bamboo lemur (Prolemur simus), the gray-headed lemur (Eulemur cinereiceps), the collared brown lemur (E. collaris), and the red-bellied lemur (E. rubriventer).
 
As well as lemurs, the forest are home to seven endemic genera of rodents, six endemic genera of carnivorans and several species of bat. Rare animals include the brown-tailed mongoose (Salanoia concolor). Of the 165 bird species found here 42 are endemic to the region, such as the rare red-tailed newtonia (Newtonia fanovanae). The forests are also home to 50 endemic reptiles and 29 amphibians such as the following chameleons: Calumma gallus, Calumma cucullatum, Furcifer balteatus, Furcifer bifidus, Brookesia superciliaris, and Brookesia therezieni. The freshwater fish population, with more than 100 endemic species, is also unique.

The lowland forests are home to many of endemic and limited-range species of birds. The brown mesite (Mesitornis unicolor), red-breasted coua (Coua serriana), scaly ground roller (Geobiastes squamiger), nuthatch vanga (Hypositta corallirostris), helmet vanga (Euryceros prevostii), Bernier's vanga (Oriolia bernieri), red-tailed newtonia (Newtonia fanovanae), and dusky tetraka (Xanthomixis tenebrosa) are largely endemic to the lowland forests, ranging occasionally into the lower montane forests. The Madagascar serpent eagle (Eutriorchis astur), short-legged ground roller (Brachypteracias leptosomus), Madagascar red owl (Tyto soumagnei), Pollen's vanga (Xenopirostris polleni), and brown emu-tail (Bradypterus brunneus) live in both the lowland forests and montane forests. The rufous vanga (Schetba rufa) and Madagascar green pigeon (Treron australis) are widespread Madagascar lowland birds who inhabit the humid lowland forests as well as the dry forests on the west of the island.

A famous extinct species is Delalande's coua (Coua delalandei) which has not been seen since the 19th century.

Threats and preservation

Madagascar's lowland rainforests have been preserved generally better than the high central plateau, but there has still been substantial loss. Widespread slash-and-burn activity in the lowland rainforests is one of the major reasons. Slash-and-burn is a method sometimes used by shifting cultivators to create short term yields from marginal soils. When practiced repeatedly, or without intervening fallow periods, the nutrient-poor soils may be exhausted or eroded to an unproductive state. Another threat is the selective exploitation of some species, such as palms and tree ferns.

10.79% of the ecoregion is in protected areas, including national parks and reserves. They include:
Ambato Atsinanana
Analamazaotra National Park
Andasibe-Mantadia National Park
Andohahela National Park
Kalambatritra Reserve
Manombo Special Reserve
Marojejy National Park
Ranomafana National Park
Mangerivola Special Reserve
Masoala National Park
Tsitongambarika
Zahamena National Park

Gallery

See also
Ecoregions of Madagascar

References

External links
 
 Rainforests of Madagascar (WildMadagascar.org)

 
Tropical and subtropical moist broadleaf forests
Forests of Madagascar
Ecoregions of Madagascar
Sava Region
Atsinanana
Vatovavy-Fitovinany
Atsimo-Atsinanana
Anosy